The 2017 New York Lizards season was the seventeenth season for the New York Lizards, a charter franchise of Major League Lacrosse. It is also their fifth season using the New York moniker. The team came in trying to improve upon their 8–6 record in 2016 that was good enough for a second seed in the postseason, but ultimately resulted in a 20–17 semifinal loss to the Denver Outlaws.

On February 16, 2017, face off specialist Greg Gurenlian announced that he would be retiring at the end of the season. On August 5, Gurenlian played in his last game. Despite a 17–14 win over the Charlotte Hounds, the Lizards finished 7–7 and missed out on the playoffs for the first time in four years. Gurenlian won 20 of his 33 faceoffs in his last game in front of the largest crowd of the season. He holds the career record of 2,024 faceoff wins.

At the trade deadline on June 27, the Lizards traded Dave Lawson and Chris LaPierre for the Boston Cannons' team captain Will Manny and Joe LoCascio. On July 14, the Cannons announced that neither Lawson nor LaPierre would suit up for the team that season. Dave Lawson informed team officials that he would be retiring from the league while Chris LaPierre decided not to report to the team. The Lizards said that they were not aware of the intentions of Lawson or LaPierre. There wasn't a no-report clause in the deal. The Cannons appealed to the league for compensation, but did not receive any.

Schedule

Regular season

Standings

References

External links
 Team Website

New York Lizards seasons
New York Lizards
2017 in sports in New York (state)